Do Kuhak (also Romanized as Do Kūhak, Dokoohak, and Dow Kūhak; also known as Dahkak and Do Kahak) is a village in Howmeh-ye Sharqi Rural District, in the Central District of Ramhormoz County, Khuzestan Province, Iran. At the 2006 census, its population was 464, in 93 families.

References 

Populated places in Ramhormoz County